Arcturus is a neighborhood within the unincorporated community of Fort Hunt, Virginia in Fairfax County, Virginia, United States. Arcturus lies south of Alexandria between the George Washington Memorial Parkway and the Potomac River.

References

Unincorporated communities in Fairfax County, Virginia
Unincorporated communities in Virginia
Washington metropolitan area
Virginia populated places on the Potomac River